Strong Medicine is a 1981 American drama film written and directed by Richard Foreman and starring Kate Manheim, Scotty Snyder, Bill Raymond, Harry Roskolenko and Ron Vawter.

Premise
Adaptation of an avant-garde play about Rhoda (Kate Manheim), a hysterical heroine who feels oppressed by the people around her. She suffers through her birthday party. She then goes to see a doctor, plans a vacation. She argues a lot and even breaks the fourth wall.

Cast
 Kate Manheim as Rhoda
 David Warrilow as Doctor
 Ron Vawter as Max
 Bill Raymond as Young Man
 Harry Roskolenko as Old Man
 Scotty Snyder as Old Woman
 Ruth Maleczech as Eleanor
 Carol Kane
 Raul Julia as Raoul
 Buck Henry
 Wallace Shawn as Birthday Party Guest (uncredited)

Reception
Leonard Maltin awarded the film two and a half stars.

References

External links
 

American drama films
1980s English-language films
1980s American films